Ryan Wright (born 28 October 1991) is an English professional rugby league footballer who plays as  for the Oldham RLFC in Betfred League 1.

Wright started his career at Dewsbury Rams in 2013 an spent two season at the club before joining Doncaster partway through the 2015 season.  At the end of the 2015 season he rejoined Dewsbury for 2016 but returned to Doncaster on loan during the 2016 season.  A permanent move to Doncaster was made for 2017 but at the end of the 2017 season he signed for Keighley Cougars for 2018.  In July 2018 due to financial problems at Keighley, Wright left the club and joined League 1 rivals, Hunslet.

References

1991 births
Living people
Dewsbury Rams players
Doncaster R.L.F.C. players
English rugby league players
Gloucestershire All Golds players
Hunslet R.L.F.C. players
Keighley Cougars players
Oldham R.L.F.C. players
Place of birth missing (living people)
Rugby league hookers